Nakhchivan International Airport  is a civilian airport and Azeri military airbase located in Nakhchivan, the capital of the Nakhchivan Autonomous Republic, a landlocked exclave of Azerbaijan. The airport was built in the 1970s.

Facilities

Airlines and destinations

Statistics

See also
 Transport in Azerbaijan
 List of airports in Azerbaijan

References

External links
 Nakhchivan International airport at AZAL
 
 

1970s establishments in Azerbaijan
1970s establishments in the Soviet Union
Airports established in the 1970s
Airports in Azerbaijan
Azerbaijani Air Force bases
Airports built in the Soviet Union
Transportation in Nakhchivan